MASCAC may refer to:

 Massachusetts State Collegiate Athletic Conference, an athletic conference located within the state of Massachusetts.
 Middle Atlantic States Collegiate Athletic Corporation, an umbrella organization of athletic conferences located within the Mid-Atlantic United States currently known as the Middle Atlantic Conferences